WKM, or wkm, may refer to:

 WKM, the callsign for West Haven Radio, a coastal radio station in Connecticut, US
 WKM, the callsign for WKM Radio FM 91.5, an FM station in Oruro, Bolivia.
 WKM, the National Rail code for Wokingham railway station in the county of Berkshire, UK

See also